The Sentinels of Magic is a fictional team of supernaturally powered superheroes created by Geoff Johns and Matthew Dow Smith appearing in American comic books published by DC Comics. First appearing in Day of Judgment #1 (November 1999), the group is described as a loose confederation of mystic defenders the team was formed during the "Day of Judgment" storyline when the angel Asmodel led a coup against the demon Neron, a powerful demon lord of Hell. The team included DC Comics occult heroes such as Zatanna, Enchantress, Madame Xanadu, Blue Devil, Raven, and Faust.

The Sentinels of Magic appear in various media, including a new incarnation of the team making a debut in Young Justice consisting of different characters.

Publication history 
The team made their first appearance in Days of Judgement #1 (November 1999) as part of the "Day of Judgement" storyline. The title brought together several of DC Comic's occult characters as allies of the Justice League-related characters.  The team would later be involved in the major storyline "Black Baptism" within the JLA: Black Baptism (May–August 2001) miniseries in which centered around both members Sebastian Faust and the Enchantress, the latter serving as the main antagonist alongside other characters. Later, the Sentinels of Magic would appear again or the final time in the "Obsidian Age" storyline in the JLA title.

Members

In other media
 The Sentinels of Magic appear in DC Universe Online, consisting of Doctor Fate, Zatanna, and Raven along with several Apprentices, Initiates, Lightkeepers, Mentors, Sentries, and Vanguards. In the hero campaign, the players help the Sentinels stop Brother Blood from bringing Trigon to Earth.
 A band called "Zatanna and the Sentinels of Magic" appear in Lego DC Comics Super Heroes: The Flash.
 The Sentinels of Magic appear in Young Justice: Phantoms, consisting of Zatanna, Khalid Nassour, Traci Thurston, and Mary Bromfield. This version of the group was personally trained by Zatanna to free her father Zatara from Nabu's control. After the Sentinels succeed, Mary leaves the group while Zatara arranges for Nabu to have the remaining members operate as Doctor Fate via a rotation-based agreement.

References

External links

 DC Cosmic Teams: Sentinels of Magic

DC Comics superhero teams
Lists of DC characters by organization